Udburu  is a village in the southern state of Karnataka, India. It is located in the Mysore taluk of Mysore district in Karnataka.

Demographics
 India census, Udburu had a population of 8080 with 4106 males and 3974 females.

Major Landmarks
 World Peace Centre, Institute for Indian Art and Culture, Kalalavadi

See also
 Mysore
 Districts of Karnataka

References

External links

Villages in Mysore district